Mary Millicent Abigail Rogers (February 1, 1902 - January 1, 1953), better known as Millicent Rogers, was a socialite, heiress, fashion icon, jewelry designer and art collector. She was the granddaughter of Standard Oil tycoon Henry Huttleston Rogers, and an heiress to his wealth.  Rogers is notable for having been an early supporter and enthusiast of Southwestern-style art and jewelry, and is often credited for its reaching a national and international audience. Later in life, she became an activist, and was among the first celebrities to champion the cause of Native American civil rights. She is still credited today as an influence on major fashion designers.

Early life

Rogers was born February 1, 1902. Her mother was Mary Benjamin, and her father was Henry Huttleston Rogers II, whose father was one of Rockefeller's partners in Standard Oil. She grew up in Manhattan, Tuxedo Park, and Southampton, New York.

When Rogers contracted rheumatic fever as a young child, doctors predicted she would not live past the age of 10. She suffered from poor health for the rest of her life, having multiple heart attacks, bouts with double pneumonia, and a mostly crippled left arm by the time she was 40 years old.

Career
In the 1920s, as a young woman Rogers became well-known on the social scene, and photographs of her were often featured in Vogue and Harper's Bazaar. Newspaper gossip columns, such as the one in the Hearst's New York Journal-American, regularly detailed her personal life. Rogers lived as an expatriate from 1932, settling in St. Anton, Austria in 1934, and remaining in Europe until World War II began.

In 1947, Rogers retreated to a small adobe home in Taos, New Mexico, which she referred to as Turtle Walk. While living there, she purchased more than 2,000 Native American artifacts. In addition to collecting, Rogers created designs for jewelry pieces,
some of which she had commissioned, and some of which she herself made.  Her pieces are noted for being bold, modern, and abstract, 
but also draw upon motifs from  Europe, Africa, and America.

In 1951, Rogers and several prominent friends (including authors Frank Waters, Oliver La Farge, and Lucius Beebe) hired lawyers and visited Washington, D.C. to promote the issue of Indian rights and citizenship. She successfully lobbied for Native American art to be classified as historic, and therefore protected.

Personal life
Rogers was married three times during the course of her life. Her first marriage was in January 1924 when she eloped with Austrian Count Ludwig von Salm-Hoogstraeten, and they were married in a New York courtroom; she was 21 years old, and the groom was 38. A professional tennis player and an aspiring film actor through most of their short marriage, Salm-Hoogstraeten was characterized by The New York Times as "a gold-digging Austrian count" and Time called him "penniless." The couple had one son together: Peter Salm (1924-1994), but legally separated before the boy was born. Their divorce was finalized in April 1927.

On November 8, 1927, she married Arturo Peralta-Ramos. They were married in the parish house of the Catholic Church of the Sacred Heart of Jesus and Mary in Southampton, Long Island, with only Rogers' father and a few friends in attendance. Approving of the marriage, Henry Huddleston Rogers II gave the couple a $500,000 trust fund, with the provision that Peralta-Ramos "lay no future claim to the Rogers fortune, estimated at $40,000,000."  The couple had two children together: Arturo Henry Peralta-Ramos Jr. (1928-2015) and Paul Jaime Peralta-Ramos (1931-2003)

Peralta-Ramos filed for divorce on December 6, 1935, with both parties citing "extreme cruelty." Rogers' third and final husband was Ronald Balcom, an American stockbroker. They were married in Vienna on February 26, 1936, and were divorced in February 1941. They had no children together.

Rogers was romantically linked to a number of notable men throughout her life, including author Roald Dahl, actor Clark Gable, the author Ian Fleming, the Prince of Wales, Prince Serge Obolensky, and Prince Aimone, Duke of Aosta, an heir to the Italian throne.

She died in Santa Fe, New Mexico on January 1, 1953. Her legal full name at her time of death was Mary Millicent Abigail Rogers.

Legacy

Millicent Rogers Museum
In 1956, her youngest son, Paul Peralta-Ramos, founded the Millicent Rogers Museum in Taos, New Mexico. The museum houses a large collection of Native American, Hispanic, and Euro-American art, with a specific emphasis on northern New Mexico and Taos pieces. It first opened in a temporary location in the mid-1950s, later moving to its permanent location in the late 1960s, a home built by Claude J. K. and Elizabeth Anderson. It was later remodeled and expanded by architect Nathaniel A. Owings.

Fashion
Fashion designer John Galliano credited Rogers as an influence on his Spring 2010 Dior collection.

References

Further reading

 Essay by former MRM director.

External links

 
American women of style : an exhibition / organized by Diana Vreeland

1902 births
1953 deaths
American art collectors
Philanthropists from New York (state)
American socialites
Collectors of Indigenous art of the Americas
Deaths from aneurysm
People from Manhattan
People from Taos, New Mexico